Sophie Jaques (born October 16, 2000) is a Canadian ice hockey defenceman for Ohio State. She won the Patty Kazmaier Award in 2023.

Early life
Jaques played ice hockey for the Toronto Jr. Aeros of the Provincial Women's Hockey League for three seasons, where she recorded 20 goals and 25 assists in 78 games. She helped lead the Aeros to the PWHL Championship and Provincial Cup in 2016 and 2018.

Playing career
Jaques began her collegiate career for the Ohio State Buckeyes during the 2018–19 season. During her freshman year, she recorded five goals and 16 assists in 35 games. She led all Buckeyes rookies in goals, assists and points, and ranked sixth overall on the team during the season. 

During the 2019–20 season in her sophomore year, she recorded nine goals and 15 assists in 38 games. She ranked third in the conference for defenceman scoring, led all defenceman with 131 shots on goal, and ranked second on the team with 58 blocked shots. Following the season she was named to the All-WCHA Third Team. During the 2020–21 season in her junior year, she recorded two goals and two assists in a season that was shortened due to the COVID-19 pandemic. She led all WCHA defenceman with 54 shots on goal and led the team with 33 blocked shots.

During the 2021–22 season in her senior year, she recorded 21 goals and 38 assists in 38 games. She set the Ohio State single season record for points by a defenceman with 59, and matched the program single-season points record for any player. Her 59 points were the second-most single season points by a true defenceman in NCAA Division I history. During the WCHA Final Faceoff Championship game, Jaques scored the game-tying game-winning goals in the Buckeyes' overtime win against Minnesota. She was subsequently named the WCHA Final Faceoff Most Outstanding Player. She also helped lead the Buckeyes to their first NCAA women's ice hockey tournament championship in 2022. Following an outstanding season she was named to the All-WCHA First Team, and WCHA Defensive Player of the Year. She was also named a CCM/AHCA Hockey First Team All-American and, the third Buckeye to earn the first team honor. She was named a top-three finalist for the Patty Kazmaier Award, becoming the first Buckeye to be named one of the final three candidates for the award. She was also named the Ohio State University Female Athlete of the Year.

During the 2022–23 season as a graduate student, she recorded 24 goals and 24 assists in 39 games. On February 24, 2023, she recorded her first career hat-trick in a game against Bemidji State. Following an outstanding season she was named to the All-WCHA First Team, the WCHA Player of the Year, and WCHA Defensive Player of the Year for the second consecutive year. She was also named a CCM/AHCA Hockey First Team All-American and won the Patty Kazmaier Award. She became the first Buckeyes player to win the award, and the second defenseman after Angela Ruggiero in 2004. Jaques ranks second in league history in career points with 154, and with 59 goals, she is one goal away from tying the WCHA record for career goals by a defenseman.

Career statistics

Awards and honors

References

External links

2000 births
Living people
Canadian women's ice hockey defencemen
Ice hockey people from Toronto
Ohio State Buckeyes women's ice hockey players
Patty Kazmaier Award winners